Koether Inlet is an ice-filled inlet about  long, indenting the north coast of Thurston Island, Antarctica, between Edwards Peninsula and Evans Peninsula. It was first delineated from air photos taken by U.S. Navy Squadron VX-6 in January 1960.

Maps
 Thurston Island – Jones Mountains. 1:500000 Antarctica Sketch Map. US Geological Survey, 1967.
 Antarctic Digital Database (ADD). Scale 1:250000 topographic map of Antarctica. Scientific Committee on Antarctic Research (SCAR), 1993–2016.

References

Inlets of Ellsworth Land
Thurston Island